The first unofficial Lithuanian Chess Championship was held in Kaunas (Temporary capital of Lithuania) in 1921. The Champion's title was granted after victorious or drawn match between previous champion and challenger, mostly a winner of Championship of Kaunas (later - the Championship of Lithuania) in the period from 1922 to World War II. The first official Lithuanian championship was held in 1929. The next year, Lithuania joined FIDE, the World Chess Federation.

When Lithuania was part of the Soviet Union (June 1940 – June 1941 and July 1944 – March 1990), players from other Soviet Republics were sometimes invited to play in the championship. In 1951, Ratmir Kholmov won the championship ahead of the guests Andor Lilienthal, Tigran Petrosian, and Vladimir Simagin.

Winners

{| class="sortable wikitable"
! # !! Year !! City !! Winner
|-
| (1) || 1921 ||        || A. Rimša the winner of Championship of Kaunas 
|-
| (2) || 1922 ||        || Antanas Gustaitis became the Champion (Benjamin Blumenfeld emigrated to Russia before a playoff match could be arranged) 
|-
| (3) || 1923 ||        || Aleksandras Machtas, Champion of Kaunas
|-
| (4) || 1924 ||        || Aleksandras Machtas, Champion of Kaunas
|-
| (5) || 1926 ||        || Aleksandras Machtas, Champion of Kaunas
|-
| (6) || 1927 ||        || Aleksandras Machtas won a match with S. Gordonas, Champion of Klaipėda (instead of Markas Luckis, Champion of Kaunas)
|-
| (7) || 1928 ||        || Aleksandras Machtas won a match with S. Gordonas, Champion of Klaipėda (instead of Markas Luckis, Champion of Kaunas)
|-
| 1 || 1929 ||        || Aronas Jeglinas, Champion of Kaunas and Lithuania
|-
| 2 || 1930 ||        || Isakas Vistaneckis
|- 
| 3 || 1931 ||        || Aleksandras Machtas 
|-
| 4 || 1932 || Kaunas || Aleksandras Machtas
|-
| 5 || 1933 ||        || Vladas Mikėnas won a match against Aleksandras Machtas
|-
| 6 || 1934 ||        || Vladas Mikėnas won a match against Povilas Vaitonis (6:2)
|-
| 7 || 1935 ||        || Vladas Mikėnas drew a match with Isakas Vistaneckis (8:8)
|-
| 8 || 1937 ||        || Vladas Mikėnas won a match against Povilas Vaitonis (5.5:4.5)
|-
| 9 || 1938 ||        || Vladas Mikėnas won a match against Povilas Vaitonis (9:3)
|-
| 10 || 1941 ||        || Isakas Vistaneckis
|-
| 11  || 1942 ||        || Leonardas Abramavičius
|-
| 12 || 1943 || Vilnius      || Mečislovas Birmanas
|-
| * || 1944 ||        || Povilas Vaitonis was leading the interrupted tournament
|-
| 13 || 1945 || Kaunas       || Vladas Mikėnas
|-
| 14 || 1947 || Vilnius      || Vladas Mikėnas
|-
| 15 || 1948 || Vilnius      || Vladas Mikėnas
|-
| 16 || 1949 || Vilnius      || Ratmir Kholmov, Isakas Vistaneckis
|-
| 17 || 1950 || Vilnius      || Ratmir Kholmov
|-
| 18 || 1951 || Vilnius      || Ratmir Kholmov
|-
| 19 || 1952 || Vilnius      || Ratmir Kholmov
|-
| 20 || 1953 || Vilnius      || Ratmir Kholmov
|-
| 21 || 1954 || Vilnius      || Isakas Vistaneckis
|-
| 22 || 1955 || Vilnius      || Ratmir Kholmov
|-
| 23 || 1956 || Kaunas       || Isakas Vistaneckis
|-
| 24 || 1957 || Vilnius      || Ratmir Kholmov
|-
| 25 || 1958 || Vilnius      || Ratmir Kholmov
|-
| 26 || 1959 || Vilnius      || Isakas Vistaneckis, Ratmir Kholmov
|-
| 27 || 1960 || Vilnius      || Ratmir Kholmov
|-
| 28 || 1961 || Vilnius      || Vladas Mikėnas
|-
| 29 || 1962 || Druskininkai || Leonidas Maslovas
|-
| 30 || 1963 || Vilnius      || Leonidas Maslovas
|-
| 31 || 1964 || Vilnius      || Vladas Mikėnas
|-
| 32 || 1965 || Vilnius      || Vladas Mikėnas 
|-
| 33 || 1966 || Vilnius      || Leonidas Maslovas
|-
| 34 || 1967 || Vilnius      || Algimantas Butnorius
|-
| 35 || 1968 || Vilnius      || Vladas Mikėnas
|-
| 36 || 1969 || Vilnius      || Antanas Algimantas Česnauskis
|-
| 37 || 1970 || Kaunas       || Algimantas Butnorius
|-
| 38 || 1971 || Vilnius      || Jegor Čiukajevas
|-
| 39 || 1972 || Kaunas       || Gintautas Piešina
|-
| 40 || 1973 || Klaipėda     || Algimantas Butnorius
|-
| 41 || 1974 || Vilnius      || Gintautas Piešina
|-
| 42 || 1975 || Vilnius      || Algimantas Butnorius
|-
| 43 || 1976 || Kaunas       || Algimantas Butnorius
|-
| 44 || 1977 || Klaipėda     || Yuri Balashov
|-
| 45 || 1978 || Vilnius      || Gintautas Piešina
|-
| 46 || 1979 || Panevėžys    || Levas Ševeliovas
|-
| 47 || 1980 || Kaunas       || Algimantas Butnorius
|-
| 48 || 1981 || Klaipėda     || Eduardas Rozentalis
|-
| 49 || 1982 || Plungė       || Algimantas Butnorius
|-
| 50 || 1983 || Vilnius      || Aloyzas Kveinys
|-
| 51 || 1984 || Klaipėda     || Gintautas Piešina
|-
| 52 || 1985 || Vilnius      || Algirdas Bandza, Emilis Šlekys
|-
| 53 || 1986 || Vilnius      || Aloyzas Kveinys
|-
| 54 || 1987 || Vilnius      || Vidmantas Mališauskas
|-
| 55 || 1988 || Vilnius      || Gintautas Piešina
|-
| 56 || 1989 || Klaipėda     || Vidmantas Mališauskas
|-
| 57 || 1990 || Klaipėda     || Vidmantas Mališauskas
|-
| 58 || 1991 || Vilnius      || Šarūnas Šulskis
|-
| 59 || 1992 || Vilnius      || Virginijus Dambrauskas
|-
| 60 || 1993 || Vilnius      || Algimantas Butnorius
|-
| 61 || 1994 || Vilnius      || Šarūnas Šulskis
|-
| 62 || 1995 || Vilnius      || Antanas Zapolskis
|-
| 63 || 1996 || Vilnius      || Vytautas Šlapikas
|-
| 64 || 1997 || Vilnius      || Virginijus Grabliauskas
|-
| 65 || 1998 || Vilnius      || Vidmantas Mališauskas
|-
| 66 || 1999 || Vilnius      || Antanas Zapolskis
|-
| 67 || 2000 || Vilnius      || Viktorija Čmilytė
|-
| 68 || 2001 || Kaunas       || Šarūnas Šulskis
|-
| 69 || 2002 || Vilnius      || Eduardas Rozentalis
|-
| 70 || 2003 || Vilnius      || Vidmantas Mališauskas
|-
| 71 || 2004 || Vilnius      || Darius Zagorskis
|-
| 72 || 2005 || Šiauliai     || Viktorija Čmilytė
|-
| 73 || 2006 || Vilnius      || Vidmantas Mališauskas
|-
| 74 || 2007 || Šiauliai     || Šarūnas Šulskis
|-
| 75 || 2008 || Kaunas       || Aloyzas Kveinys
|-
| 76 || 2009 || Vilnius      || Šarūnas Šulskis
|-
| 77 || 2010 || Nemenčinė    || Vidmantas Malisauskas
|-
| 78 || 2011 || Nemenčinė    || Šarūnas Šulskis
|-
| 79 || 2012 || Vilnius      || Aloyzas Kveinys
|-
| 80 || 2013 || Vilnius      || Darius Zagorskis
|-
| 81 || 2014 || Vilnius    || Šarūnas Šulskis
|-
| 82 || 2015 || Kaunas || Šarūnas Šulskis
|-
| 83 || 2016 || Vilnius    || Tomas Laurusas
|-
| 84 || 2017 || Vilnius    || Vidmantas Mališauskas
|-
| 85 || 2018 || Kaunas || Vidmantas Mališauskas
|-
| 86 || 2019 || Vilnius  || Tomas Laurusas
|-
| 87 || 2020 || Vilnius  || Karolis Jukšta
|-
| 88 || 2021 || Vilnius  || Titas Stremavičius
|-
| 89 || 2022 || Vilnius  || Karolis Jukšta
|}

Women

{| class="sortable wikitable"
! Year !! City !! Winner
|-
| 1938 || Kaunas || Elena Raclauskienė 
|-
| 1949 || Vilnius || Elena Raclauskienė-Lukauskienė 
|-
| 1950 ||Vilnius||Klavdiya Čiukajeva
|-
| 1951 ||Vilnius||Klavdiya Čiukajeva
|-
| 1952 ||Vilnius||Klavdiya Čiukajeva
|-
| 1953 ||Vilnius||Klavdiya Čiukajeva
|-
| 1954 ||Vilnius|| Maria Lichtenfeld
|-
| 1955 ||Vilnius|| Maria Lichtenfeld
|-
| 1956 ||Kaunas||Marija Kartanaitė
|-
| 1957 ||Vilnius||Marija Kartanaitė
|-
| 1958 ||Vilnius||Marija Kartanaitė
|-
| 1959 ||Vilnius|| Nina Špikienė
|-
| 1960 ||Vilnius|| Nina Špikienė
|-
| 1961 ||Vilnius||Vilhelmina Kaušilaitė
|-
| 1962 ||Vilnius|| Ilana Epšteinaitė
|-
| 1963 ||Vilnius||Marija Kartanaitė
|-
| 1964 ||Vilnius||Marija Kartanaitė
|-
| 1965 ||Vilnius|| Ilana Rozentalienė
|-
| 1966 ||Vilnius||Marija Kartanaitė
|-
| 1967 ||Vilnius||Marija Kartanaitė
|-
| 1968 ||Vilnius||Vilhelmina Kaušilaitė
|-
| 1969 ||Vilnius||Marija Kartanaitė
|-
| 1970 ||Vilnius||Marija Kartanaitė
|-
| 1971 ||Vilnius||Vilhelmina Kaušilaitė
|-
| 1972 ||Vilnius||Vilhelmina Kaušilaitė
|-
| 1973 ||Vilnius|| Lilija Benensonaitė
|-
| 1974 || Kaunas || Vilhelmina Kaušilaitė 
|-
| 1975 ||Vilnius||Vilhelmina Kaušilaitė
|-
| 1976 ||Vilnius||Vilhelmina Kaušilaitė
|-
| 1977 || Panevėžys ||Vilhelmina Kaušilaitė
|-
| 1978 ||Vilnius||Rasa Kartanaitė
|-
| 1979 ||Panevėžys||Rasa Kartanaitė
|-
| 1980 ||Vilnius||Marija Kartanaitė
|-
| 1981 ||Vilnius||Esther Epstein
|-
| 1982 ||Vilnius||Esther Epstein
|-
| 1983 ||Vilnius||Rasa Kartanaitė
|-
| 1984 ||Vilnius||Esther Epstein
|-
| 1985 ||Vilnius||Marina Kurkul
|-
| 1986 || Šiauliai || Esther Epstein 
|-
| 1987 ||Šiauliai||Laima Domarkaitė
|-
| 1988 ||Šiauliai||Renata Domkutė
|-
| 1989 ||Šiauliai||Laima Domarkaitė
|-
| 1990 ||Šiauliai|| Vilma Domkutė
|-
| 1991 ||Panevėžys||Rita Dambravaitė
|-
| 1992 ||Panevėžys||Kamilė Baginskaitė
|-
| 1993 || Vilkaviškis ||Marina Kurkul
|-
| 1994 ||Vilkaviškis||Dagnė Čiukšytė
|-
| 1995 ||Panevėžys||Laima Domarkaitė
|-
| 1996 || Marijampolė ||Dagnė Čiukšytė
|-
| 1997 ||Šiauliai||Dagnė Čiukšytė
|-
| 1998 ||Vilnius||Živilė Čiukšytė
|-
| 1999 ||Vilnius||Rita Dambravaitė-Varnienė
|-
| 2000 ||Vilnius||Viktorija Čmilytė
|-
| 2001 ||Vilnius||Renata Turauskienė
|-
| 2002 || Nemenčinė || Živilė Šarakauskienė 
|-
| 2003 ||Panevėžys||Dagnė Čiukšytė
|-
| 2004 ||Šiauliai||Daiva Batytė
|-
| 2005 ||Vilnius||Simona Limontaitė
|-
| 2006 ||Šiauliai||Deimantė Daulytė
|-
| 2007 ||Vilnius||Deimantė Daulytė
|-
| 2008 ||Panevėžys||Deimantė Daulytė
|-
| 2009 ||Vilnius||Živilė Šarakauskienė
|-
| 2010 ||Nemenčinė||Vesta Kalvytė
|-
| 2011 ||Nemenčinė||Živilė Šarakauskienė
|-
| 2012 ||Vilnius||Deimantė Daulytė
|-
| 2013 ||Vilnius||Deimantė Daulytė
|-
| 2014 ||Vilnius||Salomėja Zaksaitė
|-
| 2015 ||Vilnius||Daiva Batytė
|-
| 2016 ||Vilnius||Salomėja Zaksaitė
|-
| 2017 ||Vilnius||Simona Kiseleva
|-
| 2018 ||Kaunas||Ieva Žalimaitė
|-
| 2019 ||Vilnius||Marija Šibajeva
|-
| 2020 ||Vilnius||Kamilė Baginskaitė
|-
| 2021 ||Vilnius||Gabija Šimkūnaitė
|-
| 2022 ||Vilnius||Olena Martynkova
|}

Notes

References
Lithuanian Chess Federation and Department of Physical education and Sport (1994) Šachmatų taisyklės (Vilnius)
A. Uogelė (1993) Mano šachmatai
Lietuvos čempionatai (most results and crosstables for 1943–2002)
Lietuvos vyrų šachmatų čempionatai (1943 - 2007) 
RUSBASE (part V) 1919-1937,1991-1994
RUSBASE (part IV) 1938-1960
RUSBASE (part III), 1961-1969,1985-1990
RUSBASE (part II) 1970-1984

 (full names and brief biographical details for some players)
FIDE player information (names and birth years for some currently active players)
Details of the 2000 edition
Details 2002-2007 editions
Šarūnas Šulskis biography (in Polish)

Chess national championships
Women's chess national championships
Chess in Lithuania
1929 in chess
Recurring events established in 1929
1929 in Lithuanian sport
National championships in Lithuania